Thrissur is a district situated in the central part of Kerala state, India.  Thrissur District was formed on 1 July 1949.  The headquarters of the district has the same name, Thrissur city.  It is an important cultural centre, and is known as the "cultural capital" of Kerala.  The number of schools in Thrissur District is numerous.

Colleges

Professional College
College of Agriculture Vellanikkara, Mannuthy, കേരള കാർഷിക സർവ്വകലാശാല തൃശ്ശൂർ.

Engineering Colleges
 Government Engineering College, Thrissur, Thrissur
 Christ College of Engineering, Irinjalakuda
 Sahrdaya College of Engineering and Technology, Kodakara,  Thrissur
 MET's School of Engineering, Mala, Thrissur 
 Royal College of Engineering & Technology, Akkikkavu, Thrissur
 Thejus Engineering College, Erumapetti, Thrissur 
 Malabar College of Engineering and Technology, Deshamangalam, Thrissur
 Universal Engineering College, Vellangallore, Thrissur
 Vidya Academy of Science and Technology, Thalakkottukara, Thrissur
 Axis College of Engineering and Technology, Thrissur    
 College of Dairy Science and Technology, Thrissur
 IES College of Engineering, Chittilappilly, Thrissur
 Jyothi Engineering College, Cheruthuruthy, Thrissur
 Nirmala College of Engineering, Meloor, Chalakudy, Thrissur
 Sree Ernakulathappan College of Engineering and Management, Mupliyam
  Nehru College of Engineering and Research Centre, Thrissur

Law Colleges
 Government Law College, Thrissur
 Ambookan Ittoop Memorial (AIM) College of law, Mala, Thrissur district

Arts and Science Colleges
Christ College, Irinjalakuda
St. Thomas College, Thrissur
St. Aloysius College, Thrissur
Sree Kerala Varma College, Thrissur
St. Joseph's College, Irinjalakuda
Carmel College, Mala
Little Flower College, Guruvayur
Sree Narayana College, Nattika
Sree. C. Achutha Menon Govt. College, Kuttanellur, Thrissur
Sree Krishna College, Guruvayur
K.K.T.M Govt. College, Pullut , Kodungallur
IIBMR college, Thrissur
Sree Vyasa N.S.S. College, Vyasagiri, Wadakkanchery
Ansar Computer College, Perumbilavu
Ansar Women's college, Perumbilavu
M. E. S. Asmabi College, P. Vemballur, Kodungalloor
Sacred Heart College for Women,  Chalakkudy
Sree Narayana Guru College Of Advanced Studies, Nattika
Prajyothi Niketan College, Pudukkad
Panampilly Memorial Govt. College, Chalakkudy
Naipunnya Institute of Management & Computer Technology, Pongam, Koratty
Mother Arts & Science College (unaided), Poovathur, Near Mullassery, Thrissur
A.C. Kunhimon Haji Memorial I.C.A College  Thozhiyur
Ansar Women's College, Perumpilavu
Don Bosco College, Mannuthy
Mar Dionysius College, Pazhanji
Sree Vivekananda College, Kunnamkulam
College of Applied Science, Chelakkara, Pazhayannur
College of Applied Science, Valappad
Thaqwa Aflal-ul-ulama Arabic College, Andathode, Thrissur
Jyothis College, Irinjalakuda
 UEIT College of Management & Technology, Ayyanthole, Chungam, Trichur

Nursing colleges
St. James College of Nursing, Chalakkudy, Thrissur
Govt. College of Nursing, M.G Kavu, Thrissur

Pharmaceutical Colleges 
IIAHSR paramedical College.koorkenchery, Thrissur
Nehru College of Pharmacy,  Pampady, Thiruvillwamala, Thrissur
St. James College of Pharmaceutical Sciences, Chalakudy, Thrissur

Training Colleges
Jesus Training College, Neithakudy, Mala.
Dr. Palpu Memorial S.N.D.P Yogam College of Education, Kodungallur
Ansar Training College for Women, Perumpilavu
Euphrasia Training College, Irinjalakuda
St. Joseph's Training College, Pavaratty
Mar Osthatheos Training College, Perumpilavu, Kunnamkulam
Arafa Institute for Teacher Education (unaided) Arafa Nagar, Attur
Hindi Prachara Kendra College of Teacher Education, Kodungallur
Vikram Sarabhai B Ed College, Kaipamangalam

Schools

Government Schools
Ayiranikulam GHSS Kakkilassery
GHSS Machad
Chaipankuzhy HSS Kuttichira
Chalakudy GVHSS Chalakudy
Chalakudy GHS Chalakudy
Chamakala Mappila HS, Chamakala
Chavakkad HSS, Chavakkad
Chelakkara SMTHSS, Chelakkara
Cheruthuruthy HSS Vallathol Nagar
Chempuchira HS Mattathur
Govt.MRS Chalakudy Chalakudy
DesamangalamVHS, Desamangalam
Edavilangu HSS Edavilangu
Eriyad K.V. HSS Eriyad
Elavally HS Elavally
Erumapetty HSS Erumapetty
Irinjalakuda Mode BVHSS Irinjalakuda
Irinjalakuda Model GVHSS Irinjalakuda
Karupadanna HSS karupadanna
Kattoor HS Katoor
Kodakara GHS Kodakara
Kodakara MBHS Kodakara
Kodungalloor BHS Kodungalloor
Kodungalloor GHS Kodungalloor
Kuzhur HS kuzhur
Kadappuram VHSS, Kadappuram
Kadavalloor HS Kadavalloor
Kadikkad HS Punnayoorkulam
Kaipamangalam GFVHS, Kaipamangalam
Kattilapoovam GHSS Kattilapoovam 
Kochannoor HSS Kochannoor
Kunnamkulam Model BHSS, Kunnamkulam
Kunnamkulam Model GHSS, Kunnamkulam
Meladur SHSS Meladur
Muppiliyam HS Mupliyam
Machad HSS Thekumkara
Manathala HS Manathala
Marathancode HS Marathancode
Mullassery HSS Mullassery
Nadavarambu GVHSS Nadavarambu
Nandikkara GVHSS Nandikkara
Nattika HSS Nattika Beech
Pampady HS Pampady, Thiruvilwamala
Panjal HS Panjal, Pazhayannur
Pazhanji VHS Pazhanji
Pazhayannur HSS Pazhayannur
PuthenchiraGV HSS Puthenchira
PuthukkadVHSS Pudukkad
Thalikulam VHSS Thalikulam
Thayyoor HS Thayyoor, Wadakkancherry
Thiruvilwamala VHS Thiruvilwamala
Santhipuram MARMHS Panangad
Sree Rama Varma Music School
Vadakancherry BVHSS Vadakencherry
Vadakancherry GHS Vadakencherry
Vadanappilly HS Vadanappally
Valappad VHS Vadappad
Varavoor HSS Varavoor, Wadakkancherry
Velur RGRVHSS Velur, Wadakkancherry
V.K..Raja Memorial GHS Pullut
Vettilappara VHSS Vettilappara
Vijayaraghavapuram HS Vijanaraghavapuram
Villadom GHSS Villadom

Aided Schools
Aryampadam Sarvodaya HS Puduruthi
Aloor R.M. HSS Aloor
Aloor S.N.V. HS Aloor
Anandapuram S.K. HS Anandapuram
Annanadu GHS Annanadu
Ashtramichira SHS Ashtramichira
Avittathur LB.S.M. HSS Avittathur
Azheekode S.M. HS Azheekode
Bhramakulam St. Therasan GHS Bharanakulam
Chalakudy S.S.H.C. GHSS Chalakudy
Chengaloor St. M. HS Chengaloor
Chavakkad MRRMHS Chavakkad
Chelakkara LFC GHS Chelakkara
Chemmannur A.M HS Chemmannur
Chendrapinni HS Chendrapinni
Chittattukara St. Sebastian HS, Chittattukara
Choondal LIGHS, Choondal
Chovannur St. Mary's GHS, Chownnur
Deepthi High School, Thalore
Deepthi Higher Secondary School, Thalore
Edakazhiyoor S.S.M.F. VHSS, Edakazhiyoor
Edathiruthi St. Annes HS, Edathiruthi
Elanad MLKAM HS, Elanad
Enamkkal St. Joseph HS, Enamakkal
Engandiyoor NHSS, Engandiyoor
Engandiyoor St. Thomas HS, Engandiyoor
Edathirinji H.D.P. HSS Edathirinji
Guruvayoor GKHSS, Guruvayoor
Gnanodayam Upper Primary School, Chittanda
Kalamandalam HSS, Cheruthuruthy
Kazhimpram VPM SNDP HSS Kazhimpram
Keecherry Al-Amin HS Keecherry
Kundukadu Nirmala HS Kundukada
Kunnamkulam BCGHS Kunnamkulam
Kunnamkulam MJDHS Kunnamkulam
Kallettumkara B.V.M. HS Kallettumkara
Kalparamba B.V.M. HS Aripalam
Karalom VHS Karalom
Karanchira St. X HS Karanchira
Karuvannoor St. JC GHS Karuvannoor
Kattoor Pompei St. M. HS Kattoor
Kodakara St. DB GHS Kodakkaraa
Koratty LFC GHS Koratty
Koratty MAM HS Koratty
Kottakal S.. CGHSS Mala
Kottappuram St. Annes GHS
Kottat St. A.C GHS Chalakudy West
Kuttikkad St. S. HSS Kuttikkad
Kuzhikkattussery St. Mary's GHSS Kuzhikattussery
Mammiyoor LFCGHSS Mammiyoor
Mattom St. Francis BHSS Mattom
Mattom St. Francis GHSS Mattom
Mayannur St. Thomas HS Mayannur
Mullurkara NSS HS Mulloorkara
Mundathicode NSS VHSS Mundathikode
Mala St. Antony's HSS Mala
Mambra UHSS Erayamkudi
Mapranam HC HS Maprana
Mathilakom OLF HSS Mathilakom
Mathilakom St. J HS Mathilakom
Mattathur G.K. HS Mattathur
Meloor St. J.HS Meloor
Moorkanad St. Antony's HS Moorkanad
M E S H.S, P.Vembellur
I.E.S chitilapilli, chittilapilli
Irinjalakuda L. F. C. H. S. S., Irinjalakuda
Irinjalakuda N. HSS Irinjalakuda
Irinjalakuda S. N. H. S. S., Irinjalakuda
Irinjalakuda St. M. HSS Irinjalakuda
Nattika SN Trust HSS Nattika Beech
Orumanayur Islamic HS Orumanayur
Padoor Alimul Islam HSS Padoor
Pangarippally St. Joseph HS Pangarappally
Pavaratti CKC GHS Pavaratty
Pavaratti St. Joseph HSS Pavaratty
Pengamukku HS Pengamukku
Peringanam RMVHSS Peringanam
Perumpilavu TM HS Perumpillavu
Pallissery S.ND.P. HSS Annamanada
Panangad HSS Panangad
Parappukara P.V.GHS Parappookara
Pariyaram St. George HS Pariyaram
Poyya A.K.M. HS Poyya
Puthenchira THS Puthenchira
Puthukad St. Antony's HSS Puthukad
Sacred Heart Convent Girls Higher Secondary, Thrissur
St. Mary's Convent Girls High School, Ollur
Thiruvilayannur HS Kallur
Thozhiyoor St. George HS Thozhiyoor
Thykad South Vram HS Bhramakulam
Thirumudikunnu P.S. HS Kizhakummuri
Thanissery South St. Antony's GHS Kakulassery
Thumboor RHS Thumboor
Vadanapplly KNM VHSS Vadanappally
Venmanad MASM VHSS Venmanad
Valoor N.S. HS Cheruvalloor.
Vellikulangara P.C. GHS Vellikulangara
Vynthala St. Mary's HS Palamparamb
West Mangad St: Joseph's & St: Cyril's H.S.S West Mangad

Unaided (Private Schools)
Aloor St. Joseph (EM) HS Aloor
Anandapuram St. Joseph (EM) HS Anandapuram
Al ameen Eng School Karikkad
Ansar English School
Assisi Eng School, Choondal
Bharatiya Vidya Bhavan, Poochatty
Choondal De Paul EM HS, Choondal
Chalakudy carmel HS, Chalakudy
Chaldean Syrian Higher Secondary School, Thrissur
Chinmaya Vidyalaya, Kolazhy
Concord Eng School Chiramanangad
CSM Central School, Edassery
Deepthi Higher Secondary School (Unaided), Thalore
Devamatha CMI Cambridge International School, Thangaloor.
Devamatha CMI Public School, Thiruvambadi
Darul Quran Residential school Kallumpuram
Excel Public School, Kunnamkulam
Irinjalakuda Don Bosco HS Irinjalakuda
IES Public School, Chitilappilly
IDC Eng School Orumanayur
J.M.J.E.N. HS Integrated for Blind Athani
Kadappuram Focus Islamic EM HS Kadappuram
Kulapathi Munshi Bhavan's Vidya Mandir, Pottore
Kunnamkulam Bethany St. Johns English HS Kunnamkulam
Lemer Public School, Triprayar
Madar English Medium School, Vadanappally
Mamba ul Huda English School, Kechery
NATIONAL HUDA CENTRAL SCHOOL, Orumanayur
OIET public School, Kechery
Seventh-Day Adventist Higher Secondary School, Moospet Road, Thrissur
Sirajul Uloom Eng school, Kadavallur
Snehagiri Holy Child (EM) HS, Kuruvilassery
S.M.NSS Eng.M.S, Irinjalakuda
Sree Gokulam Public School, Chittattukara
St.MMCHS, Kanippayyoor
St Joseph's Model School, Kuriachira
Thozhiyoor Rehmath EM HS Thozhiyoor
Thaqua Residential GHS Andathode A
Thaqua Residential HS Andathode
Vellikulangara Vimala HS Vellikulangara
Vimala College, Thrissur
Vidhya jothy E M S,Aripalam Aripalam
Vadakkekad ICA EM HS Vadakkekad

Special schools
Bala sahithya Samithi Chaithanya Special School, Kunnamkulam
Carmel Mount Special School, Mulloorkara
Cyrene Charitable Society Special School, Kodunga
Madona Special School, Potta
Infant Jesus Mentally Retarded School, Eranellur
Pope Paul Mercy Home (Grown Up Boys), Peringandoor
Pope Paul Mercy Home (Grown Up Girls), Peringandoor
Pope Paul Mercy Home Teachers Training Centre, Peringandoor
Pope Paul Mercy Home Santhivanam Project for Children, Peringandoor
Padma Educational Charitable Establishment, Kodungallur
Pope Paul Peace Home, Peringandoor
Pratheeksha Trining Centre, Irinjalakud
Sneha Deepthi Special School, Mannuthy
Snehagiri Mithralayam Special School, Mala
Sneharam Training Centre Special School, Manaloor
Tropical Health Foundation of India, Kunnamkulam
Reach Swasraya Special School, Kuttur

Teachers Training Institutes
Azhikode SSMTTI, Azhikode
Cheruthuruthy SN TTI Cheruthuruthy
Chalakudy G. TTI Chalakudy
KrishnaTTI, Pangad
Irinjalakuda LC TTI Irinjalakuda
Irinjalakuda S.N. TTI Irinjalakuda
Pavaratty CKC TTI Pavaratty
Mar Asthathious TTI, Perimpilavu
Vikram Sarabai TTI, Kaipamangalam

References
http://www.thrissureducation.com/
http://www.ddethrissur.org/
http://www.universityofcalicut.info/

Education in Thrissur district